The Patrician Secondary School in Newbridge, County Kildare was founded on 26 August 1958 by the Patrician Brothers in Charlotte House, Station Road. It is now situated on its own grounds, opposite St Conleth's Parish Church. It is an all-boys secondary school noted for the creative arts, sciences, and sports.

External links
 

Patrician Brothers schools
Newbridge, County Kildare
Boys' schools in the Republic of Ireland
Secondary schools in County Kildare
Educational institutions established in 1958
1958 establishments in Ireland